Helastia cymozeucta is a moth of the family Geometridae. This species is endemic to New Zealand. It was first described by Edward Meyrick in 1913 and named Xanthorhoe cymozeucta.

References

Moths of New Zealand
Endemic fauna of New Zealand
Moths described in 1913
Taxa named by Edward Meyrick
Cidariini
Endemic moths of New Zealand